Kalutara electoral district is one of the 22 multi-member electoral districts of Sri Lanka created by the 1978 Constitution of Sri Lanka. The district is conterminous with the administrative district of Kalutara in the Western province. The district currently elects 10 of the 225 members of the Sri Lankan Parliament and had 813,233 registered electors in 2010.

Presidential Elections

1982 Presidential Election
Results of the 1st presidential election held on 20 October 1982:

1988 Presidential Election
Results of the 2nd presidential election held on 19 December 1988:

1994 Presidential Election
Results of the 3rd presidential election held on 9 November 1994:

1999 Presidential Election
Results of the 4th presidential election held on 21 December 1999:

2005 Presidential Election
Results of the 5th presidential election held on 17 November 2005 for the district:

2010 Presidential Election
Results of the 6th presidential election held on 26 January 2010 for the district:

Parliamentary General Election

1989 Parliamentary General Election
Results of the 9th parliamentary election held on 15 February 1989 for the district:

The following candidates were elected:
Thilak Karunaratne (SLFP), 54,339 preference votes (pv); Indradasa Hettiarachchi (UNP), 54,099 pv; Sumitha Priyanganie Abeyweera (SLFP), 51,494 pv; Neville Fernando (SLFP), 40,977 pv; Anil Moonesinghe (SLFP), 40,320 pv; Punsiri Senaraja Perera Samaranayake (UNP), 36,150 pv; Abdul Bakeer Makar Imtiyas (UNP), 35,433 pv; Pathirage Don Abeyratne (UNP), 30,292 pv; Mangala Moonesinghe (SLFP), 28,522 pv; Manna Marakkalage Mervin Joseph Cooray (UNP), 27,991 pv; and Jayasiri Sarath Kumara Ranawaka (UNP), 20,983 pv.

1994 Parliamentary General Election
Results of the 10th parliamentary election held on 16 August 1994 for the district:

The following candidates were elected:
Ratnasiri Wickremanayake (PA), 88,213 preference votes (pv); Abeyweera Sumithra Priyanganie (PA), 85,661 pv; Reginald Cooray (PA), 85,297 pv; Kumara Welgama (PA), 79,056 pv; Ediriweera Premarathna (PA), 70,041 pv; Abdul Bakeer Markar Imthiyas (UNP), 68,519 pv; Thilak Karunarathna (UNP), 63,206 pv; Jayasiri Sarath Kumara Ranawaka (UNP), 60,506 pv; Mahinda Samarasinghe (UNP), 59,150 pv; and Anil Moonesinghe (PA), 56,071 pv.

2000 Parliamentary General Election
Results of the 11th parliamentary election held on 10 October 2000 for the district:

The following candidates were elected:
Ratnasiri Wickremanayake (PA), 148,705 preference votes (pv); Mahinda Samarasinghe (UNP), 82,511 pv; Imtiaz Bakeer Markar (UNP), 74,555 pv; Rajitha Senaratne (UNP), 73,382 pv; Reginald Cooray (PA), 67,945 pv; Tudor Dayaratne (PA), 63,636 pv; Kumara Welgama (PA), 60,394 pv; Ediriweera Premaratne (PA), 53,690 pv;  Pathirage Don (UNP), 47,271 pv; and Nandana Gunathilake (JVP), 5,628 pv.

2001 Parliamentary General Election
Results of the 12th parliamentary election held on 5 December 2001 for the district:

The following candidates were elected:
Ratnasiri Wickremanayake (PA), 120,432 preference votes (pv); Mahinda Samarasinghe (UNF), 108,583 pv; Rajitha Senaratne (UNF), 102,919 pv; Imtiaz Bakeer Markar (UNF), 89,147 pv; Kumara Welgama (PA), 81,507 pv; Tudor Dayaratne (PA), 55,181 pv; Pathirage Don Abeyratne (UNF), 52,414 pv; Rohitha Abeygunawardena (PA), 46,571 pv; Ananda Lakshman Wijemanne (UNF), 45,766; and Nandana Gunathilake (JVP), 8,312 pv.

2004 Parliamentary General Election
Results of the 13th parliamentary election held on 2 April 2004 for the district:

The following candidates were elected:
Nandana Gunathilake (UPFA-JVP), 135,743  preference votes (pv); Rajitha Senaratne (UNF-UNP), 97,001 pv; S. A. Jayantha Samaraweera (UPFA-JVP), 95,461 pv; Mahinda Samarasinghe (UNF-UNP), 93,758 pv; Reginald Cooray (UPFA-SLFP), 78,693 pv; Piyasiri Wijenayake (UPFA-JVP), 75,982 pv; Kumara Welgama (UPFA-SLFP), 73,350 pv; Rohitha Abeygunawardena (UPFA-SLFP), 62,598 pv; Sarath Ranawaka (UNF-UNP), 48,380 pv; and Athuraliye Rathana (JHU), 10,772 pv.

Reginald Cooray (UPFA-SLFP) resigned on 28 May 2004 to contest the Western provincial council elections. His replacement Nirmala Kotalawala was sworn in on 20 July 2004.

Sarath Ranawaka (UNF-UNP) died on 25 July 2009. His replacement Ananda Lakshman Wijemanna (UNF-UNP) was sworn in on 6 August 2009.

2010 Parliamentary General Election
Results of the 14th parliamentary election held on 8 April 2010 for the district:

The following candidates were elected:
Kumara Welgama (UPFA-SLFP), 124,766  preference votes (pv); Mahinda Samarasinghe (UPFA), 97,778 pv; Nirmala Kotalawala (UPFA), 82,044 pv; Rohitha Abeygunawardena (UPFA-SLFP), 77,205 pv; Rajitha Senaratne (UPFA), 66,710 pv; Reginald Cooray (UPFA-SLFP), 60,196 pv; Palitha Thewarapperuma (UNF), 51,153 pv; Vidura Wickremenayake (UPFA), 50,114 pv; Ajith Perera (UNF), 48,588 pv; and Arjuna Ranatunga (DNA), 27,796 pv.

Provincial Council Elections

1988 Provincial Council Election
Results of the 1st Western provincial council election held on 2 June 1988 for the district:

1993 Provincial Council Election
Results of the 2nd Western provincial council election held on 17 May 1993 for the district:

1999 Provincial Council Election
Results of the 3rd Western provincial council election held on 6 April 1999 for the district:

2004 Provincial Council Election
Results of the 4th Western provincial council election held on 10 July 2004 for the district:

The following candidates were elected:
Reginald Cooray (UPFA), 94,316 preference votes (pv); M.A. Janak Chaminda Wijegunawardhana (UNP), 50,013 pv; Ajith Anura Thalangama Arachchige (UPFA), 34,826 pv; Andaravass Patabendige Vass Gunawardhana (UPFA), 34,165 pv; A. Ankanath Ranjith Somawansa (UPFA), 32,515 pv; Athula Priyantha Bellana (UPFA), 32,206 pv; Angage Jagath (UPFA), 30,661 pv; Nimal Chandraratna (UPFA), 29,441 pv; Palitha Kumara Thewarapperuma (UNP), 29,167 pv; Chandrasiri Karunaratna (UPFA), 28,862 pv; Ananda Karunadhara (UPFA), 28,624 pv; H. Jagath Pushpakumara Perera (UPFA), 28,499 pv; Adikaramge Chandrabhanu (UPFA), 26,620 pv; M.A. Janak Chaminda Wijegunawardhana (UPFA), 23,261 pv; Athakoralage Sirima Ramani Kariyawasam (UNP), 21,287 pv; Ameer Mohamed Yusuf (UNP), 19,105 pv; Anil Kumara Wijesingha (UNP), 17,306 pv; Abeygunawardhana Pahalage Piyal Jayantha (UNP), 17,058 pv; Amarasekara Prasanna Palihakkara (UNP), 15,442 pv; and Aslam Mohamed Salim Mohamed (SLMC), 9,477 pv.

2009 Provincial Council Election
Results of the 5th Western provincial council election held on 25 April 2009 for the district:

The following candidates were elected:
Reginald Cooray (UPFA), 72,951 preference votes (pv); Vidura Wickramanayake (UPFA), 63,385 pv; Wikum Gunasekara (UPFA), 55,338 pv; A. Ankanath Ranjith Somawansa (UPFA), 54,099 pv; Ellawala Liyanage Lalith Ellawala (UPFA), 48,453 pv; H.M. Piyal Nishantha de Silva (UPFA), 47,540 pv; Yasapala Koralage (UPFA), 46,146 pv; Nimal Chandraratna (UPFA), 41,982 pv; Angage Jagath Thilakasiri Perera (UPFA), 38,090 pv; Adikaramge Chandrabhanu (UPFA), 34,929 pv; Wadduwage Lalith Warnakumara (UPFA), 31,791 pv; Akanadura Sumithlal Mendis (UPFA), 31,702 pv; Keerthi Kariyawasam (UPFA), 30,475 pv; Chandrasiri Karunaratna (UPFA), 28,870 pv; Ajith Perera (UNP), 28,567 pv; Palitha Kumara Thewarapperuma (UNP), 28,450 pv; Ananda Lakshman Wijemanna (UNP), 27,797 pv; Kahatapitiyage Chandra Kithsiri (UNP), 20,147 pv; Abayratne Pathirage Don (UNP), 16,656 pv; and W.A. Nalinda Wajiramal Jayatissa (JVP), 1,393 pv.

References

Electoral districts of Sri Lanka
Politics of Kalutara District